The 1971 Atlanta Falcons season was the franchise's sixth year in the National Football League (NFL).  It was the first winning season in franchise history.

Offseason

NFL Draft

Personnel

Staff

Roster

Regular season

Schedule

Note: Division opponents in bold text.

Standings

References

External links
 1971 Atlanta Falcons at Pro-Football-Reference.com

Atlanta Falcons
Atlanta Falcons seasons
Atlanta